Sava Paunović (born 1947) is a former football forward who played in Yugoslavia and Turkey.

Career
Born in Yugoslavia, Paunović started playing football for local side Radnički Kragujevac, helping them achieve promotion to the Yugoslav First League in 1969. He would join fellow First League side FK Partizan for the 1976–77 season.

In 1977, Paunović moved to Turkey, joining Süper Lig side Beşiktaş J.K. for two seasons. He made 55 appearances and scored 22 goals in the league for the club.

The Turkish Football Federation imposed a ban on foreign players in the league beginning in 1979, so Paunović returned to Yugoslavia to finish his career with Radnički Kragujevac.

References

External links
 EX YU Fudbalska Statistika po godinama
 

1947 births
Living people
Yugoslav footballers
FK Radnički 1923 players
FK Partizan players
Beşiktaş J.K. footballers
Expatriate footballers in Turkey
Association football forwards
Association football midfielders